The Metric Conversion Act of 1975 is an Act of Congress that U.S. President Gerald Ford signed into law on December 23, 1975. It declared the metric system "the preferred system of weights and measures for United States trade and commerce", but permitted the use of United States customary units in all activities. As Ford's statement on the signing of the act emphasizes, all conversion was to be "completely voluntary". The Act also established the United States Metric Board with representatives from scientific, technical, and educational institutions, as well as state and local governments to plan, coordinate, and educate the U.S. people for the Metrication of the United States.

The Metric Board was abolished in 1982 by President Ronald Reagan, largely on the suggestion of Frank Mankiewicz and Lyn Nofziger.

Executive Order 12770, signed by President George H. W. Bush on July 25, 1991, citing the Metric Conversion Act, directed departments and agencies within the executive branch of the United States Government to "take all appropriate measures within their authority" to use the metric system "as the preferred system of weights and measures for United States trade and commerce" and authorized the Secretary of Commerce "to charter an Interagency Council on Metric Policy ('ICMP'), which will assist the Secretary in coordinating Federal Government-wide implementation of this order."

See also
 History of the metric system
 Omnibus Foreign Trade and Competitiveness Act of 1988
 US Metric Association

References

Further reading

External links
 Metric Conversion Act of 1975 as amended (PDF/details) in the GPO Statute Compilations collection
 Metric Conversion Act of 1975 as enacted (details) in the US Statutes at Large

Economic history of the United States
International System of Units
Metrication in the United States